Aquaporin-5 (AQP-5) is a protein that in humans is encoded by the AQP5 gene.

Aquaporin-5 (AQP-5) is a water channel protein.  Aquaporins are a family of small integral membrane proteins related to the major intrinsic protein (MIP or AQP0). Aquaporin-5 plays a role in the generation of saliva, tears and pulmonary secretions. AQP0, AQP2, AQP5, and AQP6 are closely related and all map to 12q13.

References

Further reading

External links